WCVK (90.7 FM) is a Christian radio station with studios and transmitter located in Bowling Green, Kentucky, United States. The station is the flagship for Christian Family Radio, which currently simulcasts WCVK's programming to WJVK (91.7 FM) in Owensboro, Kentucky and WZVK (89.3 FM) in Glasgow, Kentucky, with plans to expand to other repeater stations in the region.

History 
The station went on the air on April 22, 1986. The studios were originally located at 313 State Street in downtown Bowling Green. The station was founded by James Chapman, a local businessman and farmer who still serves as the chairman of the board of directors, with the help of a group of other businesses, churches and local residents. Before going on the air, the station's organizational offices were located at First Assembly of God, two doors down from the station's current studios. Ken Cummins was the director of development before the station went on the air, and the first general manager afterward. Cummins left WCVK to serve on the mission field in Central America at some point in the 1990s.

In 2004, the station's owner, Bowling Green Community Broadcasting, purchased WJVK in Owensboro to convert it into a full-powered repeater of WCVK, broadcasting at 91.7 MHz. Six years later, the station began broadcasting on another satellite station, WZVK of Glasgow, broadcasting at 89.3 MHz.

In 2016, the station marked its 30th anniversary by updating their current studio at 1407 Scottsville Road. In June 2016, Bowling Green Community Broadcasting changed its name to Christian Family Media Ministries, Inc.

The station's format is a mix of music, primarily Christian adult contemporary, and long-form Christian programs such as Focus on the Family with James Dobson, Adventures in Odyssey, The Hour of Decision with Billy Graham, and Insight for Living with Chuck Swindoll.

Satellite stations
In addition to its main signal, WCVK/Christian Family Radio is simulcast on two additional full-power stations in the Commonwealth:

References

External links

Contemporary Christian radio stations in the United States
Bowling Green, Kentucky
Radio stations established in 1988
1988 establishments in Kentucky
CVK